Plourdosteus is an extinct genus of placoderm arthrodire which was relatively widespread in Euramerica during the Givetian to Frasnian ages of the Devonian.

Etymology
The name Plourdosteus commemorates the Plourde family at Miguasha National Park.

Taxonomy
Plourdosteus was previously assigned to the family Plourdosteidae within the Coccosteomorphi. However, subsequent studies found the family Plourdosteidae to be polyphyletic and should be dismissed. Plourdosteus was then proposed to be a member of Panxiosteidae. In the 2010 Carr & Hlavin phylogenetic study, Panxiosteidae was recognized as the sister taxon to the family Dunkleosteidae, which together comprised the superfamily Dunkleosteoidea (one of the three major clades of Eubrachythoraci).

The phylogeny of Plourdosteus within Panxiosteidae is shown in the cladogram below from the 2013 Zhu & Zhu study:

However, the subsequent 2016 Zhu et al. study using a larger morphological dataset recovered Panxiosteidae well outside of Dunkleosteoidea, instead within Coccosteomorphi and then Coccosteoidea as the sister group of Coccosteidae, as shown in the cladogram below:

References

Arthrodires
Arthrodire genera
Placoderms of North America
Placoderms of Europe
Fossil taxa described in 1951
Givetian life
Frasnian life